The O-Ringen (previously called the “Swedish 5 days”) is an orienteering competition that takes place annually in different areas of Sweden.  Orienteers from all over the world come to the competition. For orienteers around the world a trip to the O'ringen 5-days is their Mecca.
This race attracts significant media coverage in Sweden and winning O-Ringen is often considered second only to the World Championships in prestige. 
The competition takes place in July, and takes place over 5 days, where every active day is a competition stage. Competitors are assigned start times for the first four stages of the race, but on the fifth and final stage a "chasing start" is used. In a chasing start the overall leader in each class starts first and the remaining competitors start according to the total time they trail. This means that the first runner over the finish line on the final stage is the winner.

History
The O-Ringen was started in 1965 in Denmark, Skåne and Blekinge by Peo Bengtsson and Sivar Nordstöm.  156 participants attended the first and the participation levels have steadily increased since.  Up until today the highest participant level was in 1985 in Dalarna/Falun were there were 25 021 participants.

The O-Ringen was included in the World Cup orienteering series in 1998, 2007 and 2008.

In 2009 there were prize money in the Elite series, the main classes for both the men and the women, totalling to half a million kronor.  The final result in the junior elite classes will count towards the Silva Junior Cup.

From 2008 multi-sport has been represented at the competition in the form of the O-Ringen Multi.  The competition on the Tuesday will be a part of the Swedish Multi-sport Cup.

The O-Ringen Academy is a training program which consists of three sections; International, Leadership and Sports.  The International section focuses on training orienteers from all over the world who want to learn more about orienteering in order to develop the sport in their home countries.  The Leadership section is a leadership training course in the form of seminars and speeches.  The Sports section is more concerned with the physical side with training camps of different sorts, including a week for juniors before the O-Ringen.

Records
The first ever stage of the Swedish 5-Days was held in Denmark.
Ulla Lindkvist has the most titles in the women's class with eight wins.
Lars Lönnkvist has won the men's class four times

Statistics

See also
Tiomila
Jukola relay
List of sporting events in Sweden

References

External links
The 1973 edition at SVT's open archive 

Orienteering competitions
Orienteering in Sweden
July sporting events
1965 establishments in Sweden
Recurring sporting events established in 1965